Electric Version is the second studio album by Canadian indie rock group The New Pornographers. It was released on Matador Records and Mint Records on May 6, 2003.

Electric Version placed at number seven in The Village Voices Pazz & Jop poll of 2003 and was ranked at number 20 on PopMatters Best Music of 2003 list. In 2009, the album ranked number 79 in Rolling Stone'''s "100 Best Albums of the Decade".

"The Electric Version" is included as a playable song in the video game Rock Band'', after narrowly avoiding being cut.

As of 2009, sales in the United States have exceeded 113,000 copies, according to Nielsen SoundScan.

Track listing
All songs written by Carl Newman, except as noted.
 "The Electric Version" – 2:53
 "From Blown Speakers" – 2:49
 "The Laws Have Changed" – 3:26
 "The End of Medicine" – 2:37
 "Loose Translation" – 2:59
 "Chump Change" (Dan Bejar) – 4:18
 "All for Swinging You Around" – 3:42
 "The New Face of Zero and One" – 4:11
 "Testament to Youth in Verse" (Bejar) – 3:57
 "It's Only Divine Right" – 4:11
 "Ballad of a Comeback Kid" (Bejar) – 3:51
 "July Jones" – 4:18
 "Miss Teen Wordpower" – 3:23
 "Turn" (bonus track on Japanese release)

Personnel
Musicians
Carl Newman – vocals, guitar, keyboards, melodeon
Neko Case – vocals
John Collins – bass, baritone guitar, keyboards
Blaine Thurier – keyboards
Kurt Dahle – drums, percussion, vocals, double bass
Todd Fancey – guitar, keyboards
Dan Bejar (secret member) – vocals
Nora O'Connor – additional vocals
Tim Sars – saxophone
Monica Cattaway – violin
Nyla Rainey – cello

Production
 The New Pornographers - production
 Howard Redekopp - engineering, mixing

References

External links
 
 

2003 albums
The New Pornographers albums
Mint Records albums
Matador Records albums